José Sabogal (Cajabamba, March 19, 1888 – Lima, December 15, 1956) was a Peruvian painter and muralist who was "the most renowned early supporter"  and thus a leader in the artistic indigenist movement of his country. As Daniel Balderston, Mike Gonzalez, and Ana M. López assert, Sabogal "became Peru's militant indigenist and aesthetic nationalist, and led this movement for the next thirty years.

Biography 
He was born in Cajabamba, Cajamarca, Peru and traveled extensively in Europe (particularly Italy) and North Africa from 1908 to 1913 before enrolling in the National School of Fine Arts in Buenos Aires, Argentina where he studied for five years.

In 1922 he married a poet and writer María Wiesse. The couple had two children: José Rodolfo Sabogal Wiesse (1923-1983) and Rosa Teresa Sabogal Wiesse (1925-1985).

Sabogal taught at the Escuela Nacional de Bellas Artes, Lima (National School of Fine Arts, Lima) from 1920 onward.  He served as its director from 1932 to 1943.  Afterward Sabogal and Luis E. Valcárel cofounded the Instituto Libre de Arte Peruano (Free Institute of Peruvian Arts) at the Museo Nacional de la Cultura Peruana (National Museum of Peruvian Culture).

His granddaughter, Isabel Sabogal (born 1958), is a bilingual (Spanish-Polish) novelist, poet, translator and astrologer.

Indigenism
Although Sabogal's own descent was Spanish rather than indigenous, he promoted pre-Columbian culture and esthetics.  A six month stay in Cuzco prompted his indigenism; he took an interest in depicting the city and its inhabitants.  In 1919 his Cuzco paintings attracted attention at an exhibition in Lima.  As Jane Turner explains, "in 1919 was the first exhibition of the work of JOSÉ SABOGAL at the Casa 
Brandes in Lima, an event that would be immensely influential on the future..."

Sabogal decided to promote Peruvian art to international audiences after a 1922 visit to Mexico where he met Diego Rivera, José Clemente Orozco, and David Alfaro Siqueiros.  These efforts were so successful that in "the field of the visual arts, the most striking phenomenon of the 1920s was the rise of José Sabogal (1888-1956), founder and long-time leader of the so-called 'Peruvian School' of painting."

Written work 
 Mates burilados: Arte vernacular peruano (1945);
 Pancho Fierro, estampas del pintor peruano (1945);
 El toro en las artes populares del Perú (The bull in the Peruvian popular arts) (1949);
 El "kero", vaso de libaciones cusqueño de madera pintada (1952);
 El desván de la imaginería peruana (1956, 1988);
 Del arte en el Perú y otros ensayos (About Peruvian art and other essays) (1975).

Tribute 

On 19 March 2014, Google celebrated José Sabogal's 125th Birthday with a doodle.

Bibliography 
 Shreffler, Michael J. and Jessica Welton. Garcilaso de la Vega and the "New Peruvian Man": José Sabogal’s frescoes at the Hotel Cuzco. Art History. (Jan/Feb 2010, Vol 33), 124–149.

External links 
 José Sabogal's work in the peruvian digital art archive.

References 

1888 births
1956 deaths
People from Cajabamba Province
Peruvian people of Spanish descent
20th-century Peruvian painters
20th-century Peruvian male artists
Peruvian essayists
Jose
20th-century essayists
20th-century Peruvian writers
20th-century male writers
Peruvian male writers
Male essayists
Peruvian muralists
Peruvian male painters